The North American and Caribbean Senior Club Championship, organized by the North America and Caribbean Handball Confederation, is the official competition for men's handball clubs of North America and Caribbian, and takes place every year. In addition to crowning the NorCa champions, the tournament also serves as a qualifying tournament for the IHF Men's Super Globe.

History 
With the split of the Pan-American Team Handball Federation (PATHF) in 2019 into the North America and Caribbean Handball Confederation (NACHC) and South and Central America Handball Confederation(SCAHC) the Pan American Men's Club Handball Championship was folded. As result the North American and Caribbean Senior Club Championship and the South and Central American Men's Club Handball Championship were created for the qualification for the IHF Men's Super Globe. The first edition was held in Lake Placid, New York in 2019 with 3 teams. The first edition was won by New York City THC.

The third edition was won by San Francisco CalHeat.

Summary

Medal table

Per Club

Per Nation

References

 
Recurring sporting events established in 2019
North America and Caribbean Handball Confederation competitions